Life and mission of Maulana Mohammad Ilyas is a biography of Muhammad Ilyas Kandhlawi who was the founder of the movement known as Tablighi Jamaat, was written by Abul Hasan Ali Hasani Nadwi in Urdu. The English translation of it was rendered by Muhammad Asif Kidwai as Life and mission of Maulana Mohammad Ilyas. This work of Nadwi discusses the importance and necessity of dawah and Islah in Islam.

Since Nadwi was closely associated with Kandhlawi and his work, it includes author's personal observations and experiences as well. Nadwi treated the Tablighi Jamaat as a "faith revivalist movement" which consciously eschewed political activities, refraining from the communal controversy and conflict. It rooted itself among the poor and lower middle-class Muslims, emerging as a truly mass movement, with its simple message of faith in Allah, knowledge and performance of basic Islamic rituals and abandoning of un-Islamic customs, silently working to spread commitment towards Islam.

Content 
The first chapter of this work deals with the detailed accounts of the family, environment, development of Muhammad Ilyas's personality, his early education and his completion of the education. The second chapter deals with the settlement of Muhammad Ilyas in the city of Nizamuddin Auliya and his teaching there in the best possible way. The third and fourth chapter of this work deals with the religious and ethical conditions of Mewat people during the time of Mawlana Muhammad Ilyas and the commencement of Tablighi movement in Mewat in order to revive and reform the people of Mewat. The fifth chapter deals with the expansion of dawah activities of Tablighi movement outside the Mewat during the time of Muhammad Ilyas. The sixth chapter deals with the end times of Muhammad Ilyas. The seventh chapter deals with a detailed account of outstanding qualities and the prominent distinetions of Muhammad Ilyas. The last chapter deals with the ideological basis of Tablighi Jamaat, its principles and its religious and ideological foundation.

Translation 
The book was translated into English by Muhammad Asif Kidwai, into Bengali by Muhiuddin Khan, Abul Fatah Qasemi, Abu Taher Misbah.

See also 
Islam and the World

References

External links 

English Version of Life and mission of Maulana Mohammad Ilyas
Urdu Version of Life and mission of Maulana Mohammad Ilyas
Bengali Version of Life and mission of Maulana Mohammad Ilyas

1945 non-fiction books
Indian biographies
Biographies about reformers
Books by Abul Hasan Ali Hasani Nadwi
Muhammad Ilyas Kandhlawi
Deobandi literature
1945 books